KMME (100.5 FM) is a commercial radio station in Cottage Grove, Oregon, broadcasting to the Eugene-Springfield, Oregon area.

History
In 1993, KCGR was first constructed by Robert L. O'renick through his company Thornton Pfleger, Inc. to serve the city of Cottage Grove at 100.5 MHz. It was a sister station to KNND, a local AM of the same owner.

In 2005, KCGR was purchased by Eugene businessman Steve Master through his new company Diamond Peak Media. Its call sign was changed to KDPM, and a new translator station K235BF (94.9 MHz) was erected in Eugene. On December 26, Steve Master and his vice president of content Ron Burley introduced the brand Success FM, a news-talk radio format that would "exclude religion and politics."

In December 2006, Success FM changed to the brand 94.9 JAMZ, ceasing news-talk and becoming a hip-hop / R&B music station.

In January 2011, Diamond Peak Investments LLC sold KDPM and FM translator K235BF to Catholic Broadcasting Northwest, Inc. for $700,000.

On May 1, 2011 KDPM stopped broadcasting as 94.9 JAMZ. On May 19, 2011 KDPM changed callsigns to KMME. On December 20, 2011 KMME returned to the air with a Catholic religious format, simulcasting KBVM 88.3 FM Portland, Oregon.

Translators
The station is simulcasted on the following translator:

Previous logo

References

External links

MME
Cottage Grove, Oregon